Craig John Adams (born 15 February 1974) is an English former footballer who played in the Football League for Northampton Town. Since retirement, Adams has moved into coaching and management at Wellingborough Town and Bedford Town. In May 2015, he was appointed assistant to Gary Mills at Rugby Town, a club which he played for when they were known as VS Rugby, but Adams left after a poor start to the season to become caretaker manager at his former club Wellingborough Town. In May 2016, Adams left his position as Peterborough United Under 16's manager to become the assistant manager to Chris Nunn at Biggleswade Town.

References
General
 . Retrieved 28 October 2013.
Specific

1974 births
Living people
Footballers from Northampton
English footballers
Association football forwards
Northampton Town F.C. players
Rugby Town F.C. players
English Football League players
English football managers
Wellingborough Town F.C. managers
Bedford Town F.C. managers